The 2023 J2 League, also known as the  for sponsorship reasons, will be the 25th season of the J2 League, the second-tier Japanese professional league for association football clubs, since its establishment in 1999.

Overview
This is the last season to be played with 22 participating clubs, as the number of clubs will be reduced to 20 from the 2024 season.

FC Ryukyu and Iwate Grulla Morioka were relegated to the 2023 J3 League, finishing the previous J2 League season as 21st and 22nd-placed team, respectively.

Relegated from J1, both Shimizu S-Pulse and Júbilo Iwata were the only Shizuoka-based J1 teams last season. Now, they return to J2 after spending six and one season, respectively, at the top flight.

J3 winners Iwaki FC and runners-up Fujieda MYFC were both promoted from the J3 League. Both teams will make their debut in J2 League, with Iwaki being promoted to the J2 just a season after being promoted to J3.

For the first time ever since the 2004 season, three teams from the same prefecture will participate in the J2 League, as Shimizu S-Pulse, Júbilo Iwata and Fujieda MYFC are all based on Shizuoka Prefecture.

Participating clubs

Personnel and kits

Managerial changes

Transfers 

The winter transfer window will go from 6 January to 31 March, while the summer transfer window will go from 21 July to 18 August.

Foreign players
As of the 2023 season, there are no more restrictions on a number of signed foreign players, but clubs can only register up to five foreign players for a single match-day squad. Players from J.League partner nations (Thailand, Vietnam, Myanmar, Malaysia, Cambodia, Singapore, Indonesia and Qatar) are exempt from these restrictions.

Players name in bold indicates the player is registered during the midseason transfer window.
Player's name in italics indicates the player has Japanese nationality in addition to their FIFA nationality, or is exempt from being treated as a foreign player due to having been born in Japan and being enrolled in, or having graduated from school in the country.

League table

Results table

Play-offs
The usual format will be applied on the 2023 season. Promotion play-offs will be held from the semi-final stage, where the match-ups are previously semi-determined. Based on the J2 placements at the end of the regular season: The 3rd-placed team plays against the 6th-placed, while the 4th-placed team plays against the 5th-placed. The winners of the semi-finals will play the Promotion Play-offs Final, with who ever wins being promoting to the J1.

Should a match be tied at any of the play-off matches, the team with the best placement will qualify for the next stage. The placement order currently is: J2 3rd, 4th, 5th and 6th place.

For the 2023 season, three teams will be promoted to the 2024 J1 League. There will not be relegation playoffs between J1 and J2.

Season statistics

Goal contributions

Top scorers

Top assists

Clean sheets

Discipline

Player
Most yellow cards: 3
  Caio César (V-Varen Nagasaki)
  Rimu Matsuoka (Roasso Kumamoto)

 Most red cards: 1 
  Kazuki Tanaka (JEF United Chiba)
  Rimu Matsuoka (Roasso Kumamoto)
  So Nakagawa (Júbilo Iwata)
  Kim Tae-hyeon (Vegalta Sendai)
  Niki Urakami (Omiya Ardija)

Club
 Most yellow cards: 10  (Tokushima Vortis and V-Varen Nagasaki)
 Most red cards: 1 

See also

2023 Blaublitz Akita season
2023 Iwaki FC season
2023 Júbilo Iwata season

References

External links
 Official website on jleague.co 

J2 League
2
Japan